Sarothrocera lowii is a species of beetle in the family Cerambycidae, and the only species in the genus Sarothrocera. It was described by White in 1846.

References

Lamiini
Beetles described in 1846